Werner Kubitzki (10 April 1915 – 12 October 1994) was a German field hockey player who competed in the 1936 Summer Olympics.

He was a member of the German field hockey team, which won the silver medal. He played one match as forward.

External links
 
Werner Kubitzki's profile at databaseOlympics.com
Werner Kubitzki's profile at Sports Reference.com

1915 births
1994 deaths
Field hockey players at the 1936 Summer Olympics
German male field hockey players
Olympic field hockey players of Germany
Olympic silver medalists for Germany
Olympic medalists in field hockey
Medalists at the 1936 Summer Olympics
20th-century German people